Assabil Association is a non-governmental association founded in Lebanon in 1997 to establish and promote public libraries in the country in order to support democracy. The association has set up four objectives:

 Establishing, promoting, and supporting a network of public libraries throughout Lebanon.
 Sponsoring cultural and social activities that encourage people to come to the library.
 Establishing a training program for librarians and others who work in libraries.
 Encouraging the production of books and educational materials in Arabic – especially for children.

With three municipal public libraries and one original bus-library concept, Assabil Libraries continue to try to achieve their purpose of creating and providing public libraries for cultural exchange and access to information and books. It supports a network of 30 public libraries in rural areas of Lebanon and is one of the projects funded by AFAC.

Libraries 
In Beirut, Assabil Libraries created three public spaces suitable for adults and children, in Bachoura, Geitawi and Monnot. The organization has also launched a "kotobus", which translates to "books bus".

Bachoura 
In its 350sqm space, this public library in Bachoura is a municipal public library in the capital, Beirut. 

In that space, which features a children's area, a computer station and a newspaper corner, people come to read, research or attend one of the regular events of this library. There are fixed storytelling hours, film screenings, Arabic book club meetings, and other cultural events that aim at strengthening the inclusion of local public schools.

The library has books and games in Arabic, French, English, Armenian, German, Tamil, and Ethiopian.

Geitawi 
With a small garden, Geitawi public library opened its doors in 2004 inside the Jesuit public garden. The library area is 100sqm and includes a children's area. There are weekly storytelling events and International Music Day is celebrated there.

The library has books and games in Arabic, French, English, Armenian, and Spanish.

Monnot 

This municipal library has internet connection. It is a 100sqm space for children and adults to read and work. It is in the Achrafieh Monnot area.

A wide selection of books, newspapers, magazines, and games is available for all ages in Arabic, French, and English.

Kotobus 
Assabil and UNICEF joined forces to bring this idea to life and allow a simple bus to tour the country and introduce children to books, under the basic right of education in the declaration of human rights.

Resources and Training Centers 

Throughout the past years, Assabil was able to hold computer training sessions and English classes in 20 public libraries across Lebanon.

The Resource and Training Center is a resource for librarians, teachers, writers, illustrators, publishers, animators and other practitioners who work to promote reading, books and children’s literature. It has a collection of books and resources, the latter that are available for loan to librarians, teachers, educators and researchers are, for example, Arabic children’s books from Lebanon and other Arab countries (fiction and non-fiction), studies and resources on children’s literature, reference material on library management, design of library spaces, building collections and animating the library, guides on implementing activities for children, toolkits and educational resources on various issues, and reports on issues related to human rights, education and childhood in Lebanon and the Arab region.

People can also visit the Resource and Training Center to organize training workshops on technical issues such as cataloging and library management, lend available educational exhibits to public libraries, schools and cultural centers, check educational guidebooks and toolkits on human rights, gender and cultural diversity, check publication of guides for professionals on cultural activities, and pick up book donations from individuals and organizations to NGOs, public libraries and public schools, or donate books.

See also 
 List of libraries in Lebanon

References

External links 
 

Libraries in Lebanon
Education in Beirut
Organisations based in Beirut
1997 establishments in Lebanon